Michael Kirby may refer to:
Michael Kirby (judge) (born 1939), retired Australian High Court judge
Michael J. L. Kirby (born 1941), Canadian politician and Chair of the Mental Health Commission of Canada
Michael G. Kirby (born 1952), American politician
Michael Kirby (artist), American street artist 
Michael Kirby (figure skater) (1925–2002), Canadian figure skater and actor
Michael Kirby (theater) (1931–1997), professor of drama at New York University
Michael David Kirby (born 1953), U.S. diplomat and former ambassador to Moldova and Serbia